Richard Wüerst (22 February 1824 – 9 October 1881) was a German composer, music professor and pedagogue.

Wüerst was born and died in Berlin.  He was a pupil of Carl Friedrich Rungenhagen at the Prussian Academy of Arts and a pupil of Felix Mendelssohn's. He later taught in the conservatory of Theodor Kullak (what would soon become the Stern Conservatory) and edited the Neue Berliner Musikzeitung (from 1874–75). One of his notable students was Heinrich Hofmann.

Selected works

Operas
Der Rotmantel (1848 Berlin)
Vineta (21 December 1862, Bratislava)
Die Gastspielreise, Dramatisch-musikalischer Scherz en un acte (after Adolf von Winterfeld). Publié à  Berlin: Bloch, ca. 1868.
Faublas, comic opera in three acts, after a Jean-Baptiste Louvet de Couvray, libretto by Ernst Wichert (1873 Berlin)
A-ing-fo-hi, comic opera in three acts, after a story by Anton Giulio Barrili, libretto by Ernst Wichert (28 January 1878, Berlin)
Die Offiziere der Kaiserin (1878 Berlin)
Der Stern von Turan

Symphonies
Three symphonies (including opus 21 in F, second symphony opus 54(2?) in D minor and opus 36 in C minor, no. 3)
A concerto for violin, op. 37

Instrumental music
Russian Suite for Strings, op. 81
Three string quartets, op.33 (A minor, D major, G major)

Sources
Chrysander, Friedrich and Müller, Joseph. . Knuf. Volume 2, 9 Mar. 1864 issue.
Opera Glass
Wüerst, Richard Ferdinand; Butler, Maynard, trans. (1893) . 5th edition. Boston Music Company.

Notes

External links
 
 
 Author: Wüerst, Richard. Digitalisierte Werke in der Bayer. Staatsbibliothek

1824 births
1881 deaths
German Romantic composers
German opera composers
Male opera composers
German music educators
Musicians from Berlin
19th-century classical composers
German male classical composers
19th-century German composers
19th-century German male musicians